Dielsia is a genus of plants in the Restionaceae described as a genus in 1904. There is  only one known species, Dielsia stenostachya, endemic to Western Australia.

Species in homonymic genus
In 1929, Kudô used the name Dielsia in reference to a plant in the Lamiaceae, thus creating an illegitimate homonym. He also created one species in his genus, i.e.
Dielsia oreophila (Diels) Kudô, syn of Isodon oreophilus (Diels) A.J.Paton & Ryding

References

Restionaceae
Monotypic Poales genera
Endemic flora of Australia
Taxa named by Barbara G. Briggs